A list of films produced in Croatia. For an A-Z list of Croatian films see :Category:Croatian films.

1910s

1920s

1930s

1940s

1950s
List of Croatian films of the 1950s

1960s
List of Croatian films of the 1960s

1970s
List of Croatian films of the 1970s

1980s
List of Croatian films of the 1980s

1990s

2000s

2010s

2020s

References

External links
Croatian film at the Internet Movie Database
Croatian Cinema Database at hrfilm.hr 
List of Croatian feature films 1944–2006 kept at the Croatian National Archive 
FILMOGRAFIJA HRVATSKIH CJELOVEČERNJIH FILMOVA (po redateljima)